The Prometheus Man is a 1982 novel by American writer Ray Nelson. In this novel, a monopolistic insurance company takes control of planet Earth from a huge balloon drifting around the world; however, a cunning woman ruins the plans of this insurance company.

At the first Philip K. Dick Award ceremony in 1983, The Prometheus Man was awarded a Special Citation.

References

External links
 Ray Nelson website

1982 American novels
1982 science fiction novels
American science fiction novels